Lego Technic Test Track, Technic Coaster, Project X - Test Strecke and X-treme Racers are the names of five identical steel wild mouse roller coasters (three of which are still operating) manufactured by Mack Rides at Legoland theme parks around the world.

History

The first installation opened at Legoland California in 2001 as Technic Coaster. This was followed by Legoland Deutschland's Project X - Test Strecke and Legoland Billund's X-treme Racers in 2002.

On March 20, 2004, Jungle Coaster opened at Legoland Windsor in the Adventure Land section of the park. The ride however closed in 2009 in preparation of its relocation to Legoland Florida. The site of Jungle Coaster is now occupied by the Legoland Hotel. Jungle Coaster reopened on October 15, 2011 as LEGO TECHNIC Test Track at Legoland Florida in the Lego Technic section of the park.

On September 15, 2012, Legoland Malaysia opened Lego Technic Test Track.

The Great Lego Race 
On November 22, 2017, Project-X at Legoland Malaysia Resort became The Great Lego Race. The upgrade was designed by Merlin Magic Making and opened by Senior Theme Park and Water Park Manager Daan Duijm. The opening of The Great LEGO Race was marketed as the world’s first LEGO® virtual reality roller coaster.

On March 23, 2018, the Legoland Florida version of Project X became The Great Lego Race, a VR coaster. Although the experience is still the same, it has a brand new theme.

During 2018, the Legoland Deutschland version of Project X was upgraded to The Great Lego Race with VR. In the 2019 season, the ride was downgraded again, but the new name stayed. The only difference compared to the original version is a new entrance design.

Locations

Ride experience

Each of the rides are Mack Rides' large park variation of their wild mouse roller coasters. After climbing the lift hill, the train makes a hairpin turn and drops down followed by a normal Wild Mouse track.

See also
 2011 in amusement parks
 2012 in amusement parks
 The Fly at Canada's Wonderland, a roller coaster with an identical layout

References

Amusement rides that closed in 2009
Roller coasters in Florida
Roller coasters in the United Kingdom
Roller coasters in Denmark
Roller coasters in California
Roller coasters in Germany
2001 establishments in California